Steve "The Viking" Foster (born 28 December 1960 in Salford) is a retired English professional boxer of the 1980s and '90s who won the Commonwealth light middleweight title and IBF Inter-Continental light middleweight title, and was a challenger for the World Boxing Association (WBA) Inter-Continental light middleweight title against Shaun Cummins, BBBofC British light middleweight title against Robert McCracken, International Boxing Federation (IBF) Inter-Continental light middleweight title against Bahre Ahmeti, World Boxing Organization (WBO) light middleweight title against Ronald "Winky" Wright, BBBofC British middleweight title against Howard Eastman, World Boxing Federation (WBF) middleweight title against Cornelius Carr, and International Boxing Organization (IBO) middleweight title against Mpush Makambi, his professional fighting weight varied from , i.e. welterweight to , i.e. super middleweight.

References

External links

1960 births
English male boxers
Light-middleweight boxers
Light-welterweight boxers
Living people
Middleweight boxers
Boxers from Manchester
Sportspeople from Salford
Super-middleweight boxers